Arctic moss is a common name for several plants and may refer to:

Calliergon giganteum, an aquatic moss
Cladonia, a genus of lichens